The 31st European Men's Artistic Gymnastics Championships was held from 19 to 25 May 2014 at the Arena Armeec in Sofia, Bulgaria.

Schedule 
The competition schedule is as follows (all times are local, EEST, UTC+03:00).

Wednesday, 21 May 2014
10:00–20:30 Junior team final and individual qualifying session

Thursday, 22 May 2014
10:00–20:15 Senior qualifying session

Friday, 23 May 2014
17:00–19:15 Junior all-around final

Saturday, 24 May 2014
14:30–17:00 Senior team final

Sunday, 25 May 2014
10:00–12:40 Junior individual event finals
15:00–18:55 Senior individual event finals

Medalists

Senior Results

Team

Floor Exercise

Pommel Horse

Still Rings

Vault

Parallel Bars

Horizontal Bar

Junior Results

Team  
The junior team competition also served as the qualifying round for the all around finals as well as the junior event finals. The format of the competition included four gymnasts per team competing on each event with the highest three scores counting towards the team total. The highest scoring all around and event gymnasts advanced to finals.

Individual All-Around

Floor Exercise

Pommel Horse

Still Rings

Vault

Parallel Bars

Horizontal Bar

Qualification

Seniors

Team Competition

Floor Exercise

Pommel Horse

Still Rings

Vault

Parallel Bars

Horizontal Bar

Juniors

Individual All-Around

Floor Exercise

Pommel Horse

Still Rings

Vault

Parallel Bars

Horizontal Bar

Medal count

Combined

Seniors

Juniors

References

http://www.ueg.org/media/results/850/MAG_ECh_SOFIA_Media_Book.pdf

External links
 }

European Men's Artistic Gymnastics Championships
Gymnastics
2014 in Bulgarian sport
Sports competitions in Sofia
International gymnastics competitions hosted by Bulgaria
European Artistic Gymnastics Championships